Mastixiodendron plectocarpum is a species of plant in the family Rubiaceae. It is found in Indonesia and Papua New Guinea. It is threatened by habitat loss.

References

plectocarpum
Near threatened plants
Taxonomy articles created by Polbot